Peace on Earth (sculpture) may refer to:

 A Monument to Peace: Our Hope for the Children
 Peace on Earth (Lipchitz), Los Angeles, California, U.S.